2014–15 Serie A1 is the 70th season of the Italian Championship (Italian Volleyball League) organized under the supervision of Federazione Italiana Pallavolo.

Regular season

|}

Play–offs

Final standing

External links
Official website

Men's volleyball competitions in Italy
2014 in Italian sport
2015 in Italian sport